Paul Koch may refer to:

 Paul Koch (cyclist) (1897–1959), German cyclist
 Paul Koch (footballer) (born 1966), Luxembourg footballer
 Paul Koch (runner) (born ?), American runner in the 2006 World Long Distance Mountain Running Challenge

See also
 Paulie Koch (born 1996), American wakeboarder
 Paul Koech (1969–2018), Kenyan distance and marathon runner
 Paul Kipsiele Koech (born 1981), Kenyan runner